United States Government Policy and Supporting Positions (more commonly referred to as the Plum Book) is a book that lists positions in the United States government that are subject to political appointment. It lists around 9,000 federal civil service leadership and support positions in the legislative and executive branches of the federal government that may be subject to noncompetitive appointment nationwide. It is a publication of the United States Senate's Committee on Governmental Affairs and the House of Representatives' Committee on Government Reform. A new edition is published every four years, just after each presidential election. All tenured positions commissioned by the president are published, including all officers of the United States, their immediate subordinates, policy executives and advisors, and aides who report to these officials. Some positions are kept secret and not published due to being classified via executive privilege.

History
The Plum Book originated in 1952 during the Eisenhower administration to identify presidentially appointed positions within the federal government. For twenty years, the Democratic Party had controlled the federal government. When President Eisenhower took office, the Republican Party requested a list of government positions that the new president could fill. The next edition of the Plum Book appeared in 1960 and has since been published every four years, just after a presidential election.

Older editions of the Plum Book are held by any federal depository library. The Government Printing Office (now the United States Government Publishing Office) began to make the Plum Book available as an app for the first time in December 2012. The 2020 edition was published on December 1, 2020.

Plum Books are considered an important resource for presidents-elect of the United States during their presidential transitions, aiding them in identifying federal government positions to which they can name appointees.

Number of appointments by agency
, there are 7,935 political appointments across the executive and legislative branches of the U.S. federal government. Many of these positions must be filled by the incoming president every four years while others are career appointments that outlast presidential administrations.

These positions are published in the Plum Book, a new edition of which is released after each United States presidential election. The list is provided by the U.S. Office of Personnel Management (OPM).

Key

Executive branch – departments

Independent agencies and government corporations

Legislative branch

See also 

 List of positions filled by presidential appointment with Senate confirmation
 List of United States political appointments across party lines

References

External links 
Publication download list includes "United States Government Policy and Supporting Positions (Plum Book)" 
OPM
Complete 2020 Plum Book

Executive Office of the President of the United States
Publications of the United States government
United States presidential transitions
Civil service in the United States
United States government officials